Conus chiapponorum is a species of sea snail, a marine gastropod mollusk in the family Conidae, the cone snails and their allies.

Like all species within the genus Conus, these snails are predatory and venomous. They are capable of "stinging" humans, therefore live ones should be handled carefully or not at all.

Description
The size of the shell varies between 18 mm and 60 mm.

Distribution
This marine species occurs off Southern Madagascar.

References

 Lorenz F. (2004) Two new species of Conidae from Southern Madagascar. Visaya 1(2): 19–23. 
 Bozzetti L. (2010) Two new species of Conidae (Gastropoda: Prosobranchia: Conidae) from Southern Madagascar. Malacologia Mostra Mondiale 68: 3-5.

External links
 Puillandre N., Duda T.F., Meyer C., Olivera B.M. & Bouchet P. (2015). One, four or 100 genera? A new classification of the cone snails. Journal of Molluscan Studies. 81: 1–23
 The Conus Biodiversity website
 
 Holotype at MNHN, Paris

chiapponorum
Gastropods described in 2004